Prisoner of Love may refer to:

In music:
 "Prisoner of Love" (Russ Columbo song), 1931, popularized by many others as well
 "Prisoner of Love" (Miami Sound Machine song), 1984
 "Prisoner of Love" (Tin Machine song), 1989
 "Prisoner of Love" (Hikaru Utada song), 2008
 "Prisoner of Love", a song by Bob and Tom (as "Slam & Dave") from Planet Bob & Tom
 "Prisoner of Love", a 1998 song by Tania Evans
 Prisoner of Love (Geoffrey Williams album), 1989
 Prisoner of Love, a 1989 album by Kenny Garrett
 Prisoner of Love (James Brown album), 1963
 "Prisoner of Love", a song by Foreigner from their album The Very Best ... and Beyond
 "Prisoner of Love", a song by Jessica 6
 "Prisoner of Love" (1986), a song by Millie Scott
 
In other media:
 "Prisoner of Love" (Law & Order), an episode of Law & Order
 Prisoner of Love (book), a book by Jean Genet
 Prisoner of Love (film), a 1999 film starring Naomi Campbell and Tony Munch
 "Prisoners of Love", an episode of the TV series Adventure Time
 "Prisoner of Love", a fictional reality TV dating show set in a prison in the movie Slow Learners

See also
Prisoners of Love (disambiguation)